Abraham Lincoln Capital Airport  is a civil-military airport in Sangamon County, Illinois, United States, three miles (6 km) northwest of downtown Springfield. It is owned by the Springfield Airport Authority (SAA).

The airport is included in the Federal Aviation Administration (FAA) National Plan of Integrated Airport Systems for 2019–2023, in which it is categorized as a non-hub primary commercial service facility.

It is the seventh busiest airport of the 12 commercial airports in Illinois.

History
The airport has dedicated in November 1947 under the name "Capital Airport." It came after pressure to construct a modern facility, as American Airlines and Chicago & Southern Airlines had canceled flight to Springfield a year earlier due to inadequate facilities at Capital Airport's predecessor. Construction on the new airport was began soon after those cancellations but were delayed due to World War II.

The original airport had three 5300-foot runways, a service apron, a temporary passenger terminal, and T-hangars for 38 aircraft.

Two units of the Illinois National Guard was stationed at the airport in 1946, and one of them remains at the airport today.

In 2018, the airport embarked on an upgrade of its passenger terminal after receiving nearly $7 million from the Airport Improvement Program, a grant sponsored by the Federal Aviation Administration. The airport also worked to improve general aviation facilities like the FBO and hangars; roadways; and parking lots.

The coronavirus  pandemic brought about airline suspensions at the airport, marking a significant downturn of traffic through the airport. Airlines returned service as travel picked up and after receiving money from the federal CARES Act to prop up flights.

The Illinois Department of Transportation named SPI the top primary airport in the state in 2020. The department considered things such as how well the airport worked with the state's Division of Aeronautics, the airport's safety record, promotion of aviation and educational events and general maintenance.

In 2021, the airport received $3 million in funding from the State of Illinois to upgrade facilities during the travel downturn caused by the Covid-19 pandemic. The funds went towards rehabilitating the north airport public parking lot and the north airport roadway. The airport also began constructing a new crosswind runway in 2021 to accommodate more traffic in a wider variety of wind conditions.

The airport is taking significant steps to prepare their facilities to accommodate electric-powered aircraft. The airport broke ground on a solar energy farm in 2022 to increase the role of renewable energy in powering the airport, with the goal of powering over 90% of the airport's needs with renewables.

Military use
The airport is home to Capital Airport Air National Guard Station, a  facility on land leased from the Springfield Airport Authority (SAA). It is home to the 183d Fighter Wing (183 FW), an Illinois Air National Guard unit operationally gained by the Air Combat Command (ACC) and State Headquarters, Illinois Air National Guard.  Historically a fighter unit, the 183 FW consists of 321 full-time and 800 part-time military personnel (total strength 1,321).

Facilities
It has two runways: 4/22 is 8,001 by 150 feet (2,439 x 46 m) concrete; and13/31 is 7,400 by 150 feet (2,256 x 46 m) asphalt.

In the year ending July 31, 2019 the airport had 26,597 aircraft operations, average 73 per day: 66% general aviation, 18% military, 15% air taxi, and 1% airline. In June 2020, 169 aircraft were based at the airport: 133 single-engine, 29 multi-engine, 6 jet, and 1 helicopter.

The airport has an FBO offering fuel, general maintenance, catering, hangars, courtesy cars, conference rooms, a crew lounge, snooze rooms, and more.

Terminal services
The airport terminal has a Subway, a gift shop, an automated teller machine, TV, and a lounge.

Airlines and destinations

Allegiant Air is the only airline using mainline jets: the Airbus A320 series.  American Eagle and United Express flights from Springfield are on regional jets.

The airport was previously served by Ozark Airlines McDonnell Douglas DC-9-10s, DC-9-30s and Fairchild Hiller FH-227s to St. Louis and Chicago O'Hare Airport.  Air Illinois flew BAC One-Elevens (to St. Louis and Chicago) and also served the airport with Hawker Siddeley HS 748s, Handley Page Jetstreams and de Havilland Canada DHC-6 Twin Otters.  Among other routes, Air Illinois HS 748s flew nonstop to now closed Meigs Field on the lakefront next to downtown Chicago.

Statistics

Carrier shares

Top destinations

Accidents & Incidents
On December 20, 2007, a Beechcraft Bonanza crashed in Springfield while en route to SPI. The pilot reported a problem while flying the Instrument Landing System approach and deviated from the approach, flying around until crashing. The probable cause was found to be loss of control during an instrument approach due to spatial disorientation.
On January 6, 2011, a Learjet 35A crashed while landing at SPI. The crew reported the aircraft's master warning and stick shaker activated when the aircraft was on short final while flying an instrument approach procedure. The aircraft impacted left of the runway centerline before departing the right side of the runway. The two pilots received minor injuries, and the passengers were uninjured. The probable cause of the accident was found to be the pilot's decision to conduct an instrument approach in icing conditions without the anti-ice system activated, resulting in an inadvertent aerodynamic stall due to in-flight accumulation of airframe icing.
On January 27, 2020, a twin-engine Piper Aerostar aircraft crashed outside SPI after takeoff en route for Huntsville, Alabama. Officials reported at the time that the aircraft was having trouble with its instruments. Former Springfield mayor Frank Edwards and then-current Sangamon County Coroner Cinda Edwards were among those killed in the crash.

References

External links
 
 Aerial image as of 14 April 1998 from USGS The National Map
 
 

Airports in Illinois
Buildings and structures in Sangamon County, Illinois
Springfield, Illinois
Monuments and memorials to Abraham Lincoln in the United States